Jennifer Duffy (born 1983 in Cork) is a camogie player, footballer and camogie development officer, winner of All Ireland camogie medals in 2009. A former student at Cork IT, Jenny is the Camogie Regional Development officer in South Leinster. She is the holder of All-Ireland championship and league medals with CIT as well as Senior and Junior All-Ireland championship medals and National League. She won a Senior county championship with her club and captained CIT to the Ashbourne Shield title in 2006.

References

External links 
 Official Camogie Website
 Cronin’s championship diary in On The Ball Official Camogie Magazine
 https://web.archive.org/web/20091228032101/http://www.rte.ie/sport/gaa/championship/gaa_fixtures_camogie_oduffycup.html Fixtures and results] for the 2009 O'Duffy Cup
 All-Ireland Senior Camogie Championship: Roll of Honour
 Video highlights of 2009 championship Part One and part two
 Video Highlights of 2009 All Ireland Senior Final
 Report of All Ireland final in Irish Times Independent and Examiner

1983 births
Living people
Cork camogie players